Suzanne Jayne Dingle (born 1958) is an international lawn and indoor bowler representing Jersey.

Suzie was part of the fours team with Christine Grimes, Gean O'Neil and Karina Bisson that won the silver medal at the 2004 World Outdoor Bowls Championship in Leamington Spa.

References 

1958 births
Living people
Jersey female bowls players